Tural Abbasov (born April 25, 1990) is an Azerbaijani swimmer, who specialized in sprint freestyle events. He represented his nation Azerbaijan at the 2008 Summer Olympics, placing himself among the top 80 swimmers in the 50 m freestyle.

Abbasov was invited by FINA to compete as a lone male swimmer for Azerbaijan in the men's 50 m freestyle at the 2008 Summer Olympics in Beijing. Swimming in heat four, Abbasov raced his way to fourth place in a splash-and-dash finish with a lifetime best of 26.31 seconds. Abbasov failed to advance into the semifinals, as he placed seventy-eighth overall out of ninety-seven swimmers in the prelims.

References

External links
NBC 2008 Olympics profile

1990 births
Living people
Olympic swimmers of Azerbaijan
Swimmers at the 2008 Summer Olympics
Azerbaijani male freestyle swimmers
Sportspeople from Baku
21st-century Azerbaijani people